Kieran James Keane (born 9 February 1954) is a New Zealand rugby union coach and former rugby union player. A second five-eighth, Keane represented Canterbury at a provincial level, and was a member of the New Zealand national side, the All Blacks, in 1979. He played six matches for the All Blacks but did not appear in any official internationals.

On 20 February 2017, it was announced that Keane will be the new head coach of Connacht Rugby, taking over once Pat Lam leaves in June 2017.
On 30 April 2018, it was announced that Keane would be leaving Connacht at the end of the season after one year in charge.

References

1954 births
Living people
Rugby union players from Christchurch
People educated at St Bede's College, Christchurch
New Zealand rugby union players
New Zealand international rugby union players
Canterbury rugby union players
Rugby union centres
New Zealand rugby union coaches